Channel 56 refers to several television stations:

Canada
The following television stations operate on virtual channel 56 in Canada:
 CJEO-DT in Edmonton, Alberta

See also
 Channel 56 virtual TV stations in the United States

56